Bentota River Airport is an airport in Bentota, Sri Lanka .

Airlines and destinations

References

Airports in Sri Lanka
Sri Lanka Air Force bases
Buildings and structures in Galle District